There are 87 counties in the U.S. state of Minnesota. There are also several historical counties.

On October 27, 1849, nine counties were established: Benton, Dahkotah, Itasca, Ramsey, Mahkahta, Pembina, Wabasha, Washington, and Wahnata. Six of these names still exist. With the foundation of Kittson County on March 9, 1878, Pembina County no longer existed. When Minnesota was organized as a state, 57 of the present 87 counties were established. The last county to be created was Lake of the Woods County in 1923.

The names of many of the counties allude to the long history of exploration. Over ten counties are named for Native American groups residing in parts of what is now Minnesota. Another fifteen counties are named after physical geographic features, and the remainder for politicians.

The FIPS county code is the five-digit Federal Information Processing Standard (FIPS) code which uniquely identifies counties and county equivalents in the United States. The three-digit number is unique to each individual county within a state, but to be unique within the entire United States, it must be prefixed by the state code. This means that, for example, the number 001 is shared by Aitkin County, Minnesota, Adams County, Wisconsin, and Adair County, Iowa. To uniquely identify Aitkin County, Minnesota, one must use the state code of 27 plus the county code of 001; therefore, the unique nationwide identifier for Aitkin County, Minnesota is 27001. The links in the column FIPS County Code are to the Census Bureau Info page for that county.

List
{{Countytabletop
|region_width      =
|fips_ref          = 
|region_seat_title = County seat
|region_seat_width =
|region_seat_ref   = 
|data2_title       = 
|data2_width       =
|data2_ref         = 
|data3_title       = Origin
|data3_width       =
|data3_ref         = 
|data4_unsortable  = yes
|population_ref    = 
|area_ref          = <ref name="Cen">

|}

Historical counties
St. Clair County, Indiana (1801–12) (Transferred to Illinois in 1809)
St. Charles County, Louisiana (1809–13) (Transferred to Missouri in 1812)
Madison County (IL) (1812–18) Formed from St. Clair County (IL)
Michilimackinac County, Michigan Territory (1818–37)
Crawford County, Michigan and Wisconsin Territories (1818–40)
Chippewa County, Michigan Territory (1827–37)
Dubuque County (MI) (1834–37)
Fayette County (WI) (1837–49)
St. Croix County, Wisconsin Territory (1840–49)
La Pointe County, Wisconsin Territory (1845–49) Formed from St. Croix
Mahkatah County (1849–51) (Mahkahto) (One of Original 9 counties) Dissolved to Pembina and Cass
Wahnata County (1849–51) (One of Original 9 counties) Dissolved to Pembina and Cass
Buchanan County (1857–61) Formed from Pine County, Dissolved back to Pine
Pierce County (1853–62) Formed from Dakota County
Superior County Name change to Saint Louis County then to Lake.
Davis County (1855–62) Formed from Cass, Nicollet, and Sibley Counties
Toombs County (1858–62) Formed from Pembina. Name Changed to Andy Johnson.
Newton County (1855–6) Formed from Itasca County and Un-Organized. Name Changed from Doty County, then to Saint Louis County.
Monroe County merged with Mille Lacs.
Lincoln County (1861–8) Formed from Renville County
Lac qui Parle County (1862–8) Formed from Davis
Manomin County (1857–1869) Formed from Ramsey County, Merged into Anoka County.
Monongalia County (1861–70) Formed from Ramsey County, Pierce County, and un-Organized. Dissolved to Kandiyohi County.
Aiken County (1857–72) Formed from Pine and Ramsey Counties, Change name to Aitkin County
Pembina County (1849–78) (One of Original 9 counties) Name Change to Kittson County
Saint Louis County. Name change from Superior, then to Lake.
Breckenridge County (1858–62) Formed from Pembina. Name Change to Clay in 1862
Andy Johnson County (1862–8) Formerly Toombs county. Named was changed to Wilkin.
Midway County (1857–8) Area created from Brown county, overlapped Pipestone county. Dissolved in 1858 when the State of Minnesota was formed and the rest of the territory not added to the state became unorganized.

References

External links
 Map of the Organized Counties of Minnesota, 1850

Minnesota, counties in
Counties